Anthonie van der Heim (28 November 1693, in The Hague – 17 July 1746, in 's-Hertogenbosch) was Grand Pensionary of Holland from 4 April 1737 to 17 July 1746.

Sources
Extensive biography from the Dutch National Archives (in Dutch).

1693 births
1746 deaths
Grand Pensionaries
Politicians from The Hague
Treasurers-General